Kuiornis indicator is an extinct New Zealand wren (Acanthisittidae) known from the early Miocene (19–16 million years ago) St Bathans fauna in Central Otago. It is known from a holotype proximal right tarsometatarsus (NMNZ S.50929). Amongst acanthisittids it is most closely related to the living rifleman.

References

Acanthisittidae
Extinct monotypic bird genera
Extinct birds of New Zealand